Edward Strutt, 1st Baron Belper PC FRS (26 October 1801 – 30 June 1880), was a British Whig Party politician. He served as Chancellor of the Duchy of Lancaster from 1852 to 1854 under Lord Aberdeen.

Background and education
Born at St Helen's House Derby, Strutt was the only son of William Strutt, of St Helen's House, Derbyshire, and the grandson of Jedediah Strutt. His mother was Barbara, daughter of Thomas Evans. He was educated at Trinity College, Cambridge, where he was President of the Cambridge Union in 1821. Strutt graduated as a Bachelor of Arts in 1823, promoted to Master of Arts three years later.

Political career
Strutt entered the British House of Commons in 1830, sitting as Member of Parliament for Derby until 1848, when he was unseated on petition. He represented Arundel from 1851 to 1852 and Nottingham from 1852 to 1856. He was Chief Commissioner of Railways between 1846 and 1848 and served as Chancellor of the Duchy of Lancaster from 1853 to 1854 in Lord Aberdeen's coalition government. He was sworn of the Privy Council in 1846 and in 1856 he was raised to the peerage as Baron Belper, of Belper, in the County of Derby.

Strutt also held the honorary posts of High Sheriff of Nottinghamshire in 1850 and Lord Lieutenant of Nottinghamshire between 1864 and 1880, having been previously a Deputy Lieutenant. In 1860 he was elected a Fellow of the Royal Society and between 1871 and 1879, he was President of University College, London.

Family

Lord Belper married Amelia Harriet Otter, daughter of the Right Reverend William Otter, Bishop of Chichester, on 28 March 1837. They had several children. They were the parents of Henry Strutt, 2nd Baron Belper.

Children from the marriage were:
Caroline Strutt (d. 23 July 1926) married Sir Kenelm Edward Digby, son of Kenelm Henry Digby and Caroline Sheppard, on 30 August 1870.
Ellen Strutt (d. 31 December 1940) married George Murray Smith the Younger on 22 October 1885.
Sophia Strutt (d. 2 December 1928) married Sir Henry Denis Le Marchant, 2nd Baronet., son of Sir Denis Le Marchant, 1st Baronet, on 7 September 1869.
William Strutt (7 May 1838 – 19 January 1856) died in Bonn, Germany.
Henry Strutt, 2nd Baron Belper (20 May 1840 – 26 July 1914)
Arthur Strutt (3 Mar 1842 – 6 February 1877) married Alice Mary Elizabeth March Phillipps de Lisle, daughter of Ambrose Lisle March Phillipps De Lisle and Laura Maria Clifford, on 22 April 1873.
 
He built his family seat, Kingston Hall, Nottinghamshire and moved in 1846.

Lord Belper died at Eaton Square, Belgravia, London, in June 1880, aged 78, and was succeeded in the barony by his second but eldest surviving son, Henry. A stained glass window was erected in the north side of the chancel in St. Mary's Church, Nottingham in his memory. Lady Belper died in December 1890.

References

External links 
 

1801 births
1880 deaths
People from Derby
Alumni of Trinity College, Cambridge
Chancellors of the Duchy of Lancaster
Whig (British political party) MPs for English constituencies
Lord-Lieutenants of Nottinghamshire
Members of the Privy Council of the United Kingdom
Presidents of the Cambridge Union
UK MPs 1830–1831
UK MPs 1831–1832
UK MPs 1832–1835
UK MPs 1835–1837
UK MPs 1837–1841
UK MPs 1841–1847
UK MPs 1847–1852
UK MPs 1852–1857
UK MPs who were granted peerages
High Sheriffs of Nottinghamshire
Fellows of the Royal Society
Strutt, Edward
Peers of the United Kingdom created by Queen Victoria
Edward